Baydar Rafi'ah (also spelled Beidar Rafi'eh or Bayt ar-Rafi'ah) is a village in northern Syria located west of Homs in the Homs Governorate. According to the Syria Central Bureau of Statistics, Baydar Rafi'ah had a population of 1,206 in the 2004 census. Its inhabitants are predominantly Alawites.

References

Bibliography

 

Populated places in Talkalakh District
Alawite communities in Syria